Mondi Gowrelly is a village in Ranga Reddy district in Andhra Pradesh, India. It falls under Yacharam mandal.

History

Geography

Religious places

Transport

Politics

Schools

Agriculture

References

Villages in Ranga Reddy district